A referendum on restoring voluntary religious education to state schools was held in Estonia between 17 and 19 February 1923. It was approved by 71.9% of voters with a turnout of 66.2%.

Background
On 5 January 1921 the Christian Democratic Party (KDP) joined Konstantin Päts' Farmers' Assemblies-led the government, and was given the Education ministry portfolio. The following year the KDP caused a split in the government by introducing a bill to provide religious education in state schools, funded by the state. Although the proposal was rejected by the Riigikogu, the party forced a referendum on the issue in early 1923.

Results

Aftermath
As the referendum was a rejection of government policy, this was considered to be a vote of no confidence on the rest of the government. The Riigikogu was subsequently dissolved and fresh elections called.

References

Referendums in Estonia
1923 referendums
1923 in Estonia